Gian Galeazzo Sforza (20 June 1469 – 21 October 1494), also known as Giovan Galeazzo Sforza, was the sixth Duke of Milan.

Early life
Born in Abbiategrasso, he was only seven years old when in 1476 his father, Galeazzo Maria Sforza, was assassinated and he became the Duke of Milan. His uncle, Ludovico Sforza, acted as regent to the young duke, but quickly wrested all power from him and became the de facto ruler of Milan. Ludovico imprisoned Gian Galeazzo and later became the duke after Gian Galeazzo's death, which was widely viewed as suspicious.

Marriage and issue
In February 1489, Gian Galeazzo married his cousin Princess Isabella of Naples. Together they had four children:
Francesco Sforza (1491–1512)
Ippolita Maria Sforza (1493–1501)
Bona Sforza (1494–1557); married Sigismund I of Poland
Bianca Maria Sforza (posthumously 1495–1496)

Death

In 1491 Ludovico Sforza had Gian Galeazzo Sforza and his wife Isabella of Aragon transferred to the Visconti Castle of Pavia  where they created a brilliant court. Gian Galeazzo died in 1494 in the Visconti Castle, the summer home of the Visconti and Sforza families. During that time, he received a visit from Charles VIII of France. According to the Italian historian Francesco Guicciardini in his History of Italy, he was poisoned by his uncle, Ludovico il Moro.

The rumor was widespread that Giovan Galeazzo's death had been provoked by immoderate coitus; nevertheless, it was widely believed throughout Italy that he had died not through natural illness nor as a result of incontinence, but had been poisoned … one of the royal physicians … asserted that he had seen manifest signs of it. Nor was there anyone who doubted that if it had been poison, it had been administered through his uncle Ludovico Sforza's machinations …

Ancestry

Notes and references

1469 births
1494 deaths
People from Abbiategrasso
Gian Galeazzo
Gian Galeazzo
Medieval child monarchs
15th-century Italian nobility